The Gran Premio del Jockey Club is a Group 2 flat horse race in Italy open to thoroughbreds aged three years or older. It is run at Milan over a distance of 2,400 metres (about 1½ miles), and it is scheduled to take place each year in October.

The event is named after the Jockey Club Italiano, a racing organisation based in Milan. It was established in 1921, and was initially contested over 1,800 metres.

The race was run over 2,000 metres in 1926 and 1927. It was extended to its current distance of 2,400 metres in 1928. Prior to 2017 it was contested at Group 1 level.

Records
Most successful horse (2 wins):
 Erba – 1928, 1929
 Norman – 1953, 1954
 Schiaparelli – 2007, 2009

Leading jockey since 1970 (6 wins):
 Frankie Dettori – Misil (1993), Shantou (1996), Kutub (2001), Cherry Mix (2005), Schiaparelli (2009), Campanologist (2011)

Leading trainer since 1970 (4 wins):
 John Dunlop – Awaasif (1983), Silvernesian (1992), Silver Patriarch (1998), Golden Snake (2000)
 Saeed bin Suroor – Kutub (2001), Cherry Mix (2005), Schiaparelli (2009), Campanologist (2011)

Leading owner since 1970 (4 wins):
 Godolphin – Kutub (2001), Cherry Mix (2005), Schiaparelli (2009), Campanologist (2011)

Winners since 1981

Earlier winners

 1921: Priapo
 1922: Scopas
 1923: Giovanna Dupre
 1924: Stella d'Italia
 1925: Major
 1926: Giambologna
 1927: Cercingoli
 1928: Erba
 1929: Erba
 1930: Fantasio
 1931: Ilario
 1932: Niccolo Pisano
 1933: Ello
 1934: Ostia
 1935: Pilade
 1936: Chilone
 1937: Milazzo
 1938: Ursone
 1939: Lafcadio
 1940: Bellini
 1941: Zuccarello
 1942:
 1943: Trau
 1944: Erno
 1945: Alleata
 1946: Fante
 1947: Tenerani
 1948: Astolfina
 1949: Antonio Canale / Grifone 1
 1950: Balestrina
 1951: Daumier
 1952: Caran d'Ache
 1953: Norman
 1954: Norman
 1955: Ribot
 1956: Tissot
 1957: Ismone
 1958: Nagami
 1959: Sedan
 1960: Rio Marin
 1961: Molvedo
 1962: Misti
 1963: Soltikoff
 1964: Veronese
 1965: Atilla
 1966: Marco Visconti
 1967: Ruysdael
 1968: Chicago
 1969: Glaneuse
 1970: Bacuco
 1971: Weimar
 1972: Tierceron
 1973: Sang Bleu
 1974: Authi
 1975: Laomedonte
 1976: Infra Green
 1977: Stateff 2
 1978: Stone
 1979: Scorpio
 1980: Pawiment

1 The 1949 race was a dead-heat and has joint winners.2 Balmerino finished first in 1977, but he was relegated to second place following a stewards' inquiry.

See also
 List of Italian flat horse races

References

 Racing Post:

 galopp-sieger.de – Gran Premio del Jockey Club.
 horseracingintfed.com – International Federation of Horseracing Authorities – Gran Premio del Jockey Club (2016).
 ippodromimilano.it – Albi d'Oro – Jockey Club.
 pedigreequery.com – Gran Premio del Jockey Club – Milano San Siro.
 tbheritage.com – Gran Premio del Jockey Club.

Horse races in Italy
Open middle distance horse races
Recurring sporting events established in 1921
1921 establishments in Italy
Sport in Milan